The Alfred and Clara Sevareid House on 2nd St., W., in Velva, North Dakota was built in 1913.  It was listed on the National Register of Historic Places in 1996.

According to its NRHP nomination, it was evaluated to be "the best example" out of all eight Craftsman architecture bungalow houses existing in Velva in 1987.

Alfred Eric Sevareid (1882-1953) was born in Kenyon, Minnesota. Clara Pauline Elizabeth Hougen (1885–1969) was born in Fargo, North Dakota. Both attended Luther College in Decorah, Iowa where they met and married prior to locating in Velva. They were the parents of  CBS news journalist  Eric Sevareid (1912–1992).

References

Houses on the National Register of Historic Places in North Dakota
Houses completed in 1913
Houses in McHenry County, North Dakota
1913 establishments in North Dakota
National Register of Historic Places in McHenry County, North Dakota
Norwegian-American culture in North Dakota
American Craftsman architecture in North Dakota